Lafomby Creek is a stream in the U.S. state of Mississippi.

Lafomby is a name possibly derived from the Chickasaw language, purported to mean "red". A variant name is "Lafomba Creek".

References

Rivers of Mississippi
Rivers of Lafayette County, Mississippi
Rivers of Tate County, Mississippi
Mississippi placenames of Native American origin